Sunnyfields is a historic home located between Monticello and Ash Lawn-Highland near Simeon, Albemarle County, Virginia. It was built in 1833, and is a two-story, nearly square brick structure painted white. It has a two-story corner tower, dating to either from just before or just after the American Civil War, and two-story, frame wing.  Also on the property is a contributing servants' cottage.  It was designed and built by William B. Phillips, who was employed by Thomas Jefferson as principal builder at the University of Virginia.

It was added to the National Register of Historic Places in 1993.

References

Houses on the National Register of Historic Places in Virginia
Houses completed in 1833
Houses in Albemarle County, Virginia
National Register of Historic Places in Albemarle County, Virginia